Love Lifted Me is the first solo studio album by Kenny Rogers for United Artists Records, released in 1976. This is Rogers' first solo effort following the break-up of The First Edition earlier that year.

The album was a minor success, reaching #28 on the Country charts.  Three singles were released from the album including the title track, a 1912 gospel hymn (released as a single in 1975), which hit #19 on the U.S. Country charts and crossed to the U.S. Hot 100 by ranking #97.  The second single, "Homemade Love", did not rank on the charts, but the final single, "While The Feeling's Good" hit #46 on the U.S. Country charts.

Track listing

Personnel
 Kenny Rogers – lead vocals 
 George Richey, Hargus "Pig" Robbins – piano
 Billy Sanford, Dale Sellers, Fred Carter Jr., Jack Eubanks, Jerry Shook, Jimmy Capps, Jimmy Colvard, Kelso Herston, Pete Wade – guitars
 Pete Drake – steel guitar
 Tommy Allsup – six-string bass guitar
 Bob Moore – upright bass
 Buddy Harman, Jerry Carrigan, Kenny Malone – drums
 Bill Justis – string arrangements
 Carol Montgomery, The Jordanaires – backing vocals

Production
 Producer – Larry Butler
 Engineers – Billy Sherrill (tracks 1, 2 & 5-10); Rick Horton (track 4).
 Album Design – Leonard Spencer
 Front Cover Photograph – Reid Miles
 Back Cover Photograph – John Brandon

References

Kenny Rogers albums
1976 debut albums
United Artists Records albums
Albums arranged by Bill Justis
Albums produced by Larry Butler (producer)